Lothar Riebsamen (born 24 September 1957) is a German politician of the Christian Democratic Union (CDU) who served as a member of the Bundestag from the state of Baden-Württemberg from 2009 until 2021.

Political career 
Riebsamen became a member of the Bundestag in the 2009 German federal election, representing the Bodensee district. In parliament, he was a member of the Health Committee. In this capacity, he served as his parliamentary group's rapporteur on hospitals.

In July 2020, Riebsamen announced that he would not stand in the 2021 federal elections but instead resign from active politics by the end of the parliamentary term.

References

External links 

  
 Bundestag biography 

1957 births
Living people
Members of the Bundestag for Baden-Württemberg
Members of the Bundestag 2017–2021
Members of the Bundestag 2013–2017
Members of the Bundestag 2009–2013
Members of the Bundestag for the Christian Democratic Union of Germany